Horror on the Hill is an adventure module published by TSR, Inc. in 1983, for the Basic Rules of the Dungeons & Dragons fantasy role-playing game. Its product designation was TSR 9078. This 32-page book was designed by Douglas Niles, and features cover artwork by Jim Roslof. It is intended for beginning gamemasters and 5–10 player characters of levels 1–3. The module contains around 20 encounters on the surface, a monastery, three dungeon levels and three new monsters.

Plot summary
Horror on the Hill is an adventure in which the player characters assault a three-level dungeon in a cavernous labyrinth to stop a growing army of goblins and hobgoblins.

The scene of the action is Guido's Fort, located at the end of a road, with only the River Shrill, a mile wide, separating it from "The Hill". At the Fort, hardy bands of adventurers gather to plan their conquests of The Hill, the hulking mass that looms over this tiny settlement. They say the Hill is filled with monsters, and that an evil witch makes her home there. No visitor to The Hill has ever returned to prove the rumors true or false. Only the mighty river Shrill separates the player characters from the mysterious mountain.

A series of caves awaits, full of goblins and hobgoblins. At the lowest layer lies a young red dragon. It is set on a volcanic island in the midst of a river.

Publication history
Horror on the Hill was written by Douglas Niles, with a cover by Jim Roslof and interior art by Jim Holloway, and was published by TSR in 1983 as a 32-page booklet with an outer folder.

This module is designed for use with the D&D Basic Rules. Included in the module are 11 maps, 3 new monsters, and a complete set of prerolled characters.

This module was later featured in the compilation B1-B9 In Search of Adventure in 1987.

Reception
Chris Hunter reviewed the module for Imagine magazine, giving it a fairly balanced review. He criticized the quality of the surface map of the hill and noted several small errors in the text, including discrepancies between the text and the maps. On the plus side, according to him, the module contains many helpful hints for the novice gamemaster. As for content, Hunter noted that it gives little detail on the Fort itself, so that it can be easily incorporated into an existing campaign. Overall, Hunter rated the module as "balanced and logical", with the notable exception of one key encounter which he thought "unbelievable". In total, Hunter expected the module should yield 3-4 sessions of play, with "the last one producing a few deaths" if all characters are 1st level. His conclusion was that: "Apart from the hill map and the awful title, Horror on the Hill is a worthwhile addition to the Basic scenario range."

Further reading
Reviewed in Fantasy Gamer #6 (1984).

See also
 List of Dungeon & Dragon modules

References and Footnotes

External links
http://www.rpg.net/news+reviews/reviews/rev_4118.html

Dungeons & Dragons modules
Mystara
Role-playing game supplements introduced in 1983